Vernon is a city in Washington County, Florida. The population was 687 at the 2010 census; according to the U.S. Census Bureau's 2018 estimates, the city had a population of 690.

Vernon is named for George Washington's Virginia home, Mount Vernon. The pioneer town was the site of a major Indian settlement. Vernon held the county seat until 1927 when the seat was moved to Chipley.

Vernon became known as "nub city" in the 1950s and 1960s for a high number of limb loss insurance claims made in the area. Vernon was featured in Errol Morris' 1981 documentary film Vernon, Florida.

History

The city sits on the Holmes Creek where during the 1880s the creek was used as a shipping route to Bonifay and other nearby towns. The creek was also used to ship gopher tortoises due to the high value their shell carried at that time.
The town gained infamy in the late 1950s and early 1960s due to the improbably high percentage of residents who put out insurance claims on lost limbs, to the point that many speculated that residents of the town were intentionally dismembering themselves for the insurance money. Although there is no real evidence to support these speculations, these insurance claims from Vernon, with a population of 500–800, accounted for as many as 2/3 of claims nationally.

Geography

Vernon is located at  (30.621699, –85.711628).

Florida State Road 79 is the main route through the city, and leads north  to Bonifay along Interstate 10 and southwest  to Ebro. Another more local road, Florida State Road 277, begins in the city and leads northeast  to Chipley, the Washington County seat.

Demographics

As of the census of 2000, there were 743 people, 296 households, and 206 families residing in the city. The racial makeup of the city was 77.25% White, 15.75% African American, 2.42% Native American, 0.67% Asian, 0.13% from other races, and 3.77% from two or more races. Hispanic of any race were 1.48% of the population.

There were 296 households, out of which 29.7% had children under the age of 18 living with them, 50.3% were married couples living together, 16.9% had a female householder with no husband present, and 30.4% were non-families. 27.7% of all households were made up of individuals, and 16.6% had someone living alone who was 65 years of age or older. The average household size was 2.38 and the average family size was 2.80.

In the city the population was spread out, with 27.6% under the age of 18, 7.9% from 18 to 24, 24.2% from 25 to 44, 23.7% from 45 to 64, and 16.6% who were 65 years of age or older. The median age was 36 years. For every 100 females, there were 83.5 males. For every 100 females age 18 and over, there were 87.5 males.

The median income for a household in the city was $21,176, and the median income for a family was $24,196. Males had a median income of $20,000 versus $15,938 for females. The per capita income for the city was $11,869. About 21.7% of families and 28.5% of the population were below the poverty line, including 48.8% of those under age 18 and 28.1% of those age 65 or over.

References

External links

 City of Vernon
 Washington County
 Vernon Elementary School
 Vernon Middle School
 Vernon High School
 Historical Society - City of Vernon, Florida

Cities in Washington County, Florida
Former county seats in Florida
Cities in Florida